Jorawar Ram is an Indian politician and former Member of Parliament.

Early life 
Jorawar Ram born to Ram Gobind Ram at Palamu, Bihar in a Dusadh family. He did I.A from Ganesh Lal Agarwal College, Palamu, Bihar (now Jharkhand).

His elder son, Rakesh Paswan is central member of JMM and younger son, Rajesh Roshan is Palamu District Vice-President of RJD Youth.

Political career 
He was District Secretary of Socialist Party - Bihar unit in 1967—77 and District President of Lok Dal - Bihar in 1980—88.

He was Member of Bihar Legislative Assembly (now Jharkhand Vidhan Sabha Assembly) from Chhatarpur constituency and Minister in Bihar state govt.

Ram was elected to the Lok Sabha, lower house of the Parliament of India from Palamu as a member of the Janata Dal. He also fought in 2019 Lok Sabha elections as an independent candidate but lost to Vishnu Dayal Ram.

In 1990, she served as Member of Joint Committee on Offices of Profit and Consultative Committee for the Ministry of Energy.

References

1943 births
Living people
Janata Dal politicians
Lok Sabha members from Bihar
India MPs 1989–1991